OMX was a former name of the Nasdaq Nordic stock exchange group.

OMX may also refer to:

 The stock symbol for OfficeMax
 OpenMAX, a cross-platform set of C-language programming interfaces
 The ISO 639-3 code for the Old Mon language